James Walter "Jim" Slatton (born July 30, 1947) is a retired water polo player from the United States. He won the bronze medal with the Men's National Team at the 1972 Summer Olympics in Munich, West Germany. In 1999, he was inducted into the USA Water Polo Hall of Fame. Slatton was born in Los Angeles, California.

See also
 List of Olympic medalists in water polo (men)
 List of men's Olympic water polo tournament goalkeepers

References

External links
 

1947 births
Living people
American male water polo players
Water polo goalkeepers
Water polo players at the 1972 Summer Olympics
Olympic bronze medalists for the United States in water polo
Place of birth missing (living people)
Medalists at the 1972 Summer Olympics